Alfred Filadelfo Caniglia (August 21, 1921 – February 19, 1974) was an American football coach. He served as the head football coach at the University of Nebraska Omaha  from 1960 to 1973, compiling a record of 75–55–5.  Caniglia died on February 19, 1974, at Bergan Mercy Hospital in Omaha, Nebraska.

Head coaching record

College

References

External links
 

1921 births
1974 deaths
Nebraska–Omaha Mavericks football coaches
Saint Louis Billikens football coaches
High school football coaches in Illinois
University of Nebraska Omaha alumni
Sportspeople from Omaha, Nebraska